The Adelaide University Union redevelopment (1967–1975) is one of the most significant buildings in the University of Adelaide complex designed by architect Robert Dickson. Built in stages from 1967–1975 and commissioned by both the Adelaide University Union and University of Adelaide, the Union Council presented the problem that the existing university accommodation needed to be redesigned within the confines of the existing built-up site, and the facilities were to be kept in operation during redevelopment.
The design concept was to be low-rise to allow for easy movement on foot, provide important and attractive circulation spaces encouraging intercommunication. The building embraces a diversity of functions with space for a bookshop, shops, refectories, a cinema, theatre, gallery and offices, while encompassing a large five level red brick and concrete building with exposed brickwork and timber detailing. 
The redevelopment has several entrances, balconies and terraces connecting it to the multiple levels of the University site, while many aspects of the design and materiality match those of the historic University context, including works by architects Walter Bagot and Louis Laybourne-Smith.

Notes

University of Adelaide
Buildings and structures in Adelaide